Barbuligobius boehlkei, the Cryptic bearded goby, is a species of goby native to the Indian Ocean and the western Pacific Ocean where it can be found on sand-rubble substrates at depths of from .  This species grows to a length of  SL.  This species is the only known member of its genus. Its specific name honours James E. Böhlke (1930-1982) of the Academy of Natural Sciences of Philadelphia.

References

Gobiidae

Fish described in 1974